Living Soul is a live album by jazz organist Richard "Groove" Holmes which was recorded in New York in 1966 and released on the Prestige label.

Reception

Allmusic awarded the album 3 stars stating "this is a decent trio set... The relative lack of original material and the selection of several kinda corny standards to cover holds this back from the upper echelon of Holmes' recordings".

Track listing 
All compositions by Richard "Groove" Holmes except as indicated
 "Living Soul" - 8:30     
 "Blues for Yna Yna" (Gerald Wilson) - 5:12    
 "The Girl from Ipanema" (Norman Gimbel, Antônio Carlos Jobim, Vinícius de Moraes) - 5:00     
 "Gemini" (Jimmy Heath) - 9:40     
 "Over the Rainbow" (Harold Arlen, Yip Harburg) - 7:00

Personnel 
Richard "Groove" Holmes - organ
Gene Edwards - guitar
George Randall - drums

References 

Richard Holmes (organist) live albums
1966 live albums
Prestige Records live albums
Albums produced by Cal Lampley